Kishore Biyani is an Indian businessman who is the Founder & CEO of Future Group, one of India's biggest brick-and-mortar retailers. He is also the founder of retail businesses such as Pantaloon Retail and Big Bazaar.

According to Forbes magazine, he had a net worth of  billion in 2019.

Retail career

Rise 
Known for a thrifty approach to running his businesses, with precepts such as modest corporate travel and hospitality arrangements, Biyani has acknowledged the role of luck in his business success at this time, which he says was the coincidence of his ambitious ideas and the growth of an Indian middle-class with disposable income to spend. His success continued with the opening of a series of stores under the Big Bazaar  brand name from 2001. These stores were designed deliberately to appear somewhat chaotic, like the traditional bazaars with which his customers were familiar. Turnover in 2008 was 47 billion rupees.

Biyani, who has admitted to making "whimsical decisions", had ignored the prevailing opinion of modelling retail businesses on those in the West and had instead concentrated on concepts that were familiar to India. His method of communication with both the media and financiers had been perceived as poor, as were his staff recruitment choices. Considered at first to be an extravagant risk-taker lacking in worthy business connections, and shunned by his peers for all of these reasons, Biyani's success with Big Bazaar had turned him into a revered figure in the Indian retail sector and a magnet for media attention. He was running the largest retailer in the country and was named as retailer of the year by the National Retail Federation, which at one earlier point had refused even to admit him. He was, however, facing a threat from the much larger resources of conglomerates such as Aditya Birla Group and Reliance Industries, both of whom had signalled an intention to move into the retail sector.

Decline 
In addition to the threat posed by the conglomerates, the 2008 economic downturn affected Biyani's business and his methods. There were postponements in planned expansion and downsizing in some areas. Unlike other Indian retail chains, such as Shoppers Stop, that used a small amount of short-term borrowing and then financed growth through cash generated internally from sales, he had relied heavily on short-term borrowing for expansion and also diversification into numerous retail areas, including book-selling and salons. Pantaloons Retail had a debt-to-equity ratio of 3:1. Business journalist Samar Srivastava said of the collapse of Lehman Brothers in September 2008 that 

Biyani reacted to the crisis with measures such as a considerable reduction in the numbers of his mid-level management staff and a restructuring of his corporate interests. He appointed a cousin, Rakesh Biyani, more methodical and patient than himself, to take over his responsibility for the retail business and in particular to resolve issues with the poor supply chain and internal distribution logistics that had resulted from rapid expansion. He also rolled-over debt, converting it into loans that would mature in three to five years' time, and pulled out of joint venture deals with companies such as Etam. In addition, he reduced the scope, concentrating on four retail formats — fashion, food, home, and general merchandise — rather than the 22 or more with which he had previously been involved. Despite his previous disparagement of the need for the professional advice of others, Biyani turned to McKinsey and Company for assistance and also divested control to senior staff who had been recruited from large businesses such as PepsiCo. Things appeared to be improving after the initial shockwave of 2008.

Nonetheless, by April 2012, Biyani's business empire, including the non-retail elements, was performing less than its competitors and there were concerns raised about its debt levels. He announced that there were plans for a further restructuring of parts of the business to enable it to become debt-free by March 2013. A controlling stake in Pantaloon Retail was acquired by Aditya Birla Nuovo Ltd in May 2012 in a complex deal involving a demerger of the business from the wider group, and there were subsequent further dilutions of Biyani's involvement in the business. In 2016, it was renamed as Aditya Birla Fashion and Retail Ltd.

Other business interests 
Through the Future Group — to which he has attracted talented senior employees from companies such as ICICI and Reliance Industries – Biyani has taken an interest in business sectors such as insurance and the media. He has had stakes in financial services, such as the Future Capital business, and in agriculture through Future Agrovet, as well as the eZone electronics retailer. The Big Bazaar and Food Bazaar brands, which have been targeted at cost-conscious consumers, were compared to Wal-mart.

Biyani has also had a foray into Bollywood, underwriting the critically panned box-office failure Na Tum Jaano Na Hum and Chura Liya Hai Tumne that were released in 2002 and 2003 respectively.

Books 
 With Dipayan Baishya, Biyani co-authored the book It happened in India: The Story of Pantaloons, Big Bazaar, Central and The Great Indian Consumer. , it was the best-selling business book ever published in India, with sales of over 100,000.

References

External links 

Living people
Businesspeople from Mumbai
Year of birth missing (living people)
Indian billionaires
Future Group